Oryxis monticola is a species of flowering plants in the legume family, Fabaceae. It belongs to the subfamily Faboideae. It is the only species found in the genus Oryxis.

References

Phaseoleae
Monotypic Fabaceae genera